Dessert island may refer to::

Floating island (dessert), an "island" of meringue floating in a "sea" of Crème anglaise
Dessert Island (I Am Weasel), an episode of I Am Weasel

See also
Desert island, an uninhabited island